Marin Raykov Nikolov (born 17 December 1960 in Washington, D.C., United States) is a Bulgarian politician and diplomat who was appointed to serve as a caretaker Prime Minister of Bulgaria and minister of foreign affairs of Bulgaria on 12 March 2013 by Bulgarian president Rosen Plevneliev.  He left office on 29 May 2013 with his interim deputy PM Ekaterina Zakharieva.

Raykov served as a deputy Foreign Minister in the governments of Ivan Kostov (1998–2001) and Boyko Borisov (2009–2010). From 2010 to 2013, he served as an ambassador of Bulgaria in France.

Marin Raykov’s father, Rayko Nikolov, was himself a career diplomat.

See also
Raykov Government (88th Bulgarian Cabinet)
List of foreign ministers in 2014 
 Foreign relations of Bulgaria
List of Bulgarians

References

External links

|-

1960 births
Bulgarian diplomats
Foreign ministers of Bulgaria
Living people
People from Washington, D.C.
Prime Ministers of Bulgaria
Permanent Delegates of Bulgaria to UNESCO
Ambassadors of Bulgaria to Italy
Ambassadors of Bulgaria to France
Ambassadors of Bulgaria to Monaco
University of National and World Economy alumni